This article lists the major power stations located in Hainan Province.

Coal

Natural Gas

Nuclear

Renewable

Hydroelectric

Conventional

References 

Power stations
Hainan